Dara Barrois/Dixon (née Dara Wier) (born 1949) is an American poet and the author of Tolstoy Killed Anna Karenina (Wave Books, 2022). Other titles include In the Still of the Night (Wave Books, 2017), You Good Thing (Wave Books, 2014), Reverse Rapture (Verse Press, 2005), Hat on a Pond (Verse Press, 2002) and Voyages in English (Carnegie Mellon, 2001).  She has received awards from the Lannan Foundation, American Poetry Review, The Poetry Center Book Award, Guggenheim Foundation, National Endowment for the Arts and Massachusetts Cultural Council have generously supported her work. Limited editions include (X in Fix)(2003) from Rain Taxi’s brainstorm series), Thru (2019) and Two Poems (2021) from Scram, and forthcoming in 2022,  Nine Poems from Incessant Pipe. With James Tate, she rescued The Lost Epic of Arthur Davidson Ficke, published by Waiting for Godot Books. Poems can be found in Granta, Volt, Conduit,, Incessant Pipe, Biscuit Hill, blush, can we have our ball back, Itinerant, American Poetry Review, Octopus, Gulf Coast, and The Nation. She’s been poet-in-residence at the University of Montana, University of Texas Austin, Emory University, and the University of Utah; she was the 2005 Louis Rubin chair at Hollins University in Roanoke, Virginia. She lives and works in factory hollow in Western Massachusetts.

Biography
Barrois/Dixon was born in Hôtel-Dieu, New Orleans, Louisiana, raised in Belle Chasse and Naomi, Louisiana, attended Catholic grade schools in New Orleans and Gretna, Louisiana, and high school in Baton Rouge, Louisiana, attended Louisiana State University and Longwood University. She received a Master of Fine Arts degree in poetry from Bowling Green University, 1974.

She's lived in Louisiana, Virginia, Pennsylvania, Georgia, Ohio, Texas, Alabama, New Mexico, Colorado, Montana, and Massachusetts, and spent time in San Miguel de Allende, Mexico, and Mississippi.  She writes poetry, prose and a column, "INSIDE UNDIVIDED", on chance, fate and context, from 2010 to 2015 for Flying Object's (arts non-profit) website, and from 2015 on the literary magazine jubilat's website.  She's taught poetry workshops and seminars at Bowling Green University, University of Pittsburgh, Hollins University, Emory University, University of Montana, University of Massachusetts Amherst and for summer or winter workshops in Aspen, Key West, Santa Fe, Virginia, Bennington, and the University of Massachusetts Juniper Workshops (which she co-founded in 2003 as a part of the Juniper Initiative which she co-directs).

Barrois/Dixon was married to poet James Tate until his death in 2015.

Work
Dara Barrois/Dixon has published several books and her work has also been included in recent volumes of Pushcart Prize Anthology and Best American Poetry. She has also been published in jubilat, "B O D Y", FOU, Maggy, Make, Matters, American Poetry Review, Boston Review, Volt, Hollins Critic, Now Culture, LIT, Conduit, Bat City Review, Salt River, Telephone, OH NO, glitterpony, The Nation, Open City, notnostrums, The Blue Letter, Superstition Review, Fairy Tale Review, Mississippi Review, Massachusetts Review, Denver Quarterly, slope, Poetry Time, Ink Node, Sprung Formal, Lungful, Scythe, Tin House, The Baffler, Mead, Similar Peaks, Io, and other publications.  Her poems have appeared on the Academy of American Poets poem-a-day feature, the PEN website, poemflow.

Bibliography
 Blood, Hook & Eye, University of Texas Press, 1977, 1980 
 The 8-Step Grapevine, CMU Press, 1980 
 All You Have in Common, CMU, 1984 
 The Book of Knowledge, CMU, 1987  
 Blue for the Plough, CMU, 1990 
 Our Master Plan, CMU, 1999 
 Voyages in English, CMU, 2001  
 Hat on a Pond, Verse Press, 2001  
 Reverse Rapture, Verse Press, 2005  
 Remnants of Hannah, Wave Books, 2006 
 Selected Poems, Wave Books, 2009 
 A Civilian's Journal of the War Years, The Song Cave, 2011
 You Good Thing, Wave Books, 2013 
 In the Still of the Night, Wave Books, 2017 
 I Would Like to Return the Scarf to You in Good Condition, Small Anchor Books, forthcoming
 You Stare as if Staring Were the Start of All Stars, Pilot Books, forthcoming
 The Usual Ratio Between Banality and Wonder, Rain Taxi, forthcoming

References

External links
Dara Barrois/Dixon's author page at Wave Books
Dara Wier's Selected Poems
Dara Wier at The Academy of American Poets

University of Massachusetts Amherst faculty
Louisiana State University alumni
Writers from New Orleans
1949 births
Living people
American women poets
American women academics
21st-century American women